"Penny Lane" is a song by the Beatles, named after a street in Liverpool.

Penny Lane may also refer to:

Places
 Penny Lane, Liverpool, England
 Penny Lane Mall, Calgary, Canada, 1973–2006
 Penny Lane (Guantanamo), nickname of CIA site on US Naval Base

People 
 Penny Lane (filmmaker), an American independent filmmaker
 Pennie Lane Trumbull, singer
 Penny Framstad, also called Penny Lane

Media
  Penny Lane & Time, jazz album by Kai Winding